99 teams entered the 1974 FIFA World Cup qualification rounds, competing for 16 spots in the final tournament. West Germany, as the hosts, and Brazil, as the defending champions, qualified automatically, leaving 14 spots open for competition.

The 16 spots available in the 1974 World Cup would be distributed among the continental zones as follows:
 Europe (UEFA): 9.5 places, 1 of them went to automatic qualifier West Germany, while the other 8.5 places were contested by 32 teams. The winner of the 0.5 place would advance to the Intercontinental Play-offs (against a team from CONMEBOL).
 South America (CONMEBOL): 3.5 places, 1 of them went to automatic qualifier Brazil, while the other 2.5 places were contested by 9 teams. The winner of the 0.5 place would advance to the Intercontinental Play-offs (against a team from UEFA).
 North, Central America and Caribbean (CONCACAF): 1 place, contested by 14 teams.
 Africa (CAF): 1 place, contested by 24 teams.
 Asia (AFC) and Oceania (OFC): 1 place, contested by 18 teams.

90 teams played at least one qualifying match. 226 qualifying matches were played, and 620 goals were scored (an average of 2.74 per match).

Confederation qualification

AFC and OFC

Australia qualified.

CAF

Zaire qualified.

CONCACAF

Haiti qualified.

CONMEBOL

Group 1 - Uruguay qualified.
Group 2 - Argentina qualified.
Group 3 - Chile advanced to the UEFA / CONMEBOL Intercontinental Play-off.

UEFA

Group 1 - Sweden qualified.
Group 2 - Italy qualified.
Group 3 - Netherlands qualified.
Group 4 - East Germany qualified.
Group 5 - Poland qualified.
Group 6 - Bulgaria qualified.
Group 7 - Yugoslavia qualified.
Group 8 - Scotland qualified.
Group 9 - Soviet Union advanced to the UEFA / CONMEBOL Intercontinental Play-off.

Inter-confederation play-offs: UEFA v CONMEBOL

The teams would play against each other on a home-and-away basis, with the winner qualifying to the finals.

The second leg was scratched as the Soviet Union were disqualified after they refused to travel to Santiago for the return leg due to the 1973 Chilean coup d'état and the executions of left-wing prisoners in the Santiago stadium. The match did "go ahead" with the eleven Chilean players facing zero Soviet players before thousands of bemused spectators, and half a dozen Chilean players slowly passed the ball to each other in mock play until the captain walked the ball into the net.

Qualified teams

The following 16 teams qualified for the 1974 FIFA World Cup:

Top goalscorers

12 goals
 Steve David

11 goals
 Emmanuel Sanon

7 goals
 Hristo Bonev
 Joachim Streich
 Luigi Riva
 Johan Cruyff

Notes

 For the first time in the qualifiers, goal difference was used as a tie-breaker for teams who finished level on points. Aggregate score was also used to determine the winners of two-legged ties.
 Australia was the first team from OFC to qualify for a World Cup.

References

External links
FIFA World Cup Official Site - 1974 World Cup Qualification
RSSSF - 1974 World Cup Qualification

 
Qualification
FIFA World Cup qualification
Football World Cup